Paul Greveillac, sometimes spelled Gréveillac, (born 1981) is a French novelist and author of short stories.

Paul Greveillac was awarded the prix Roger Nimier as well as the "Bourse de la Découverte de la Fondation Prince Pierre de Monaco" for his first novel, Les Âmes rouges, whose story takes place at the time of the Soviet Union. The main character is a censor, lover of cinema and literature. Les Âmes rouges was also noticed by the Académie Goncourt, which placed it on its list of reading for the 2016 summer.

In April 2017, Cadence secrète. La vie invisible d'Alfred Schnittke was published by Gallimard. It is a fictionalized biography of late 20th century composer Alfred Schnittke.

Works 
 2014: Les Fronts clandestins. Quinze histoires de Justes, Éditions , collection of short stories inspired by true stories of Righteous Among the Nations.
 2016: Les Âmes rouges, Éditions Gallimard (collection Blanche), novel.
 2017: Cadence secrète. La vie invisible d'Alfred Schnittke, Éditions Gallimard (collection Blanche), fictionalized biography.
 2018: Maîtres et Esclaves.

Honours 
 2016: Prix Roger-Nimier for Les Âmes rouges.
 2016: Bourse de la Découverte de la Fondation Prince Pierre de Monaco for Les Âmes rouges.

References 

21st-century French novelists
French male short story writers
French short story writers
Roger Nimier Prize winners
1981 births
Living people
21st-century French male writers